Trust No Bitch may refer to:

Songs
 "Trust No Bitch", by La Goony Chonga, 2018
 "Trust No Bitch", by Latto from 777, 2022
 "Trust No Bitch", by Madonna (unreleased)
 "Trust No Bitch", by Penthouse Players Clique from Paid the Cost, 1992
 "Trust No Bitch", by Onyx from #WakeDaFucUp, 2014
 "Trust No Bitch", by Todrick Hall from Forbidden, 2018

Television
 "Trust No Bitch" (Orange Is the New Black), a 2015 episode